Disonycha is a genus of flea beetles in the family Chrysomelidae, containing some 170 species in the Nearctic and Neotropics.

Selected species

 Disonycha abbreviata
 Disonycha admirabila Blatchley, 1924
 Disonycha alabamae Schaeffer, 1919
 Disonycha alternata (Illiger, 1807) (striped willow leaf beetle)
 Disonycha antennata Jacoby, 1884
 Disonycha arizonae Casey, 1884
 Disonycha balsbaughi Blake, 1970
 Disonycha barberi Blake, 1951
 Disonycha brevicornis Schaeffer, 1931
 Disonycha caroliniana (Fabricius, 1775)
 Disonycha chlorotica (Olivier, 1808)
 Disonycha collata (Fabricius, 1801)
 Disonycha conjugata (Fabricius, 1801)
 Disonycha discoidea (Fabricius, 1792) (passionflower flea beetle)
 Disonycha figurata Jacoby, 1884
 Disonycha fumata (J. L. LeConte, 1858)
 Disonycha funerea (Randall, 1838)
 Disonycha glabrata (Fabricius, 1775) (pigweed flea beetle)
 Disonycha latifrons Schaeffer, 1919
 Disonycha latiovittata Hatch in Hatch and Beller, 1932
 Disonycha leptolineata Blatchley, 1917
 Disonycha limbicollis (J. L. LeConte, 1857)
 Disonycha maritima Mannerheim, 1843
 Disonycha pensylvanica (Illiger, 1807)
 Disonycha pluriligata (J. L. LeConte, 1858)
 Disonycha politula Horn, 1889
 Disonycha procera Casey, 1884
 Disonycha punctigera (J. L. LeConte, 1859)
 Disonycha schaefferi Blake, 1933
 Disonycha semicarbonata (J. L. LeConte, 1859)
 Disonycha spilotrachela Blake, 1928
 Disonycha stenosticha Schaeffer, 1931
 Disonycha tenuicornis Horn, 1889
 Disonycha triangularis (Say, 1824) (three-spotted flea beetle)
 Disonycha uniguttata (Say, 1824)
 Disonycha varicornis Horn, 1889
 Disonycha weisei Csiki, 1939
 Disonycha weismani Blake, 1957
 Disonycha xanthomelas (Dalman, 1823) (spinach flea beetle)

References

 Riley, Edward G., Shawn M. Clark, and Terry N. Seeno (2003). "Catalog of the leaf beetles of America north of Mexico (Coleoptera: Megalopodidae, Orsodacnidae and Chrysomelidae, excluding Bruchinae)". Coleopterists Society Special Publication no. 1, 290.

Further reading

 Arnett, R. H. Jr., M. C. Thomas, P. E. Skelley and J. H. Frank. (eds.). (21 June 2002). American Beetles, Volume II: Polyphaga: Scarabaeoidea through Curculionoidea. CRC Press LLC, Boca Raton, Florida .
 Arnett, Ross H. (2000). American Insects: A Handbook of the Insects of America North of Mexico. CRC Press.
 Richard E. White. (1983). Peterson Field Guides: Beetles. Houghton Mifflin Company.

Alticini
Chrysomelidae genera
Taxa named by Louis Alexandre Auguste Chevrolat